Soyuz 12  (Union 12) was a September, 1973, crewed test flight by the Soviet Union of the newly redesigned Soyuz 7K-T spacecraft that was intended to provide greater crew safety in the wake of the Soyuz 11 tragedy. The flight marked the return of the Soviets to crewed space operations after the 1971 accident. The crew capacity of the capsule had been decreased from three to two cosmonauts to allow for pressure suits to be worn during launch, re-entry and docking. It was the first time pressure suits were used for reentry since the Voskhod 2 flight.

Cosmonauts Vasily Lazarev and Oleg Grigoryevich Makarov spent two days in space testing the new craft.

Crew

Backup crew

Reserve crew

Mission parameters 
 Mass:  
 Perigee:  
 Apogee: 
 Inclination: 51.6°
 Period: 88.6 minutes

Mission highlights 
As the first crewed test of the new version of the Soyuz ferry craft, Soyuz 12 was to have flown to a Salyut station. But the failures of Salyut 2 (4 April 1973) and Cosmos 557 (11 May 1973) in the months previous meant there was no station for the craft to dock to. The service module had no solar panels, carrying batteries for power instead, which limited the flight to about two days, enough time for a journey to and from a space station.

Cosmonauts Lazarev and Makarov wore pressure suits for launch and landing, and would have worn them for a station docking, all changes brought about by the Soyuz 11 tragedy. The bulk of the suits and their environmental control systems limited the crew size to two.

After the successful 27 September 1973 launch, the craft was maneuvered to a 326 x 344 km orbit on the second day in space, which later proved to be the standard orbit for the Salyut 4 space station. A multispectral camera in the orbital module was used in coordination with aircraft to photograph the Earth. It was reported that the intention of the camera was to survey crop and forest conditions The cosmonauts also utilised the Molniya 1 satellite to communicate with ground stations when out of range. The crew landed safely on 29 September 1973 and the mission was called "flawless". A large object was jettisoned when the craft was preparing for retrofire. The object remained in orbit for 116 days.

See also 

 1973 in spaceflight

References 

1973 in spaceflight
Crewed Soyuz missions
1973 in the Soviet Union
Spacecraft launched in 1973
Spacecraft which reentered in 1973